Ted Smith (June 14, 1886 – June 19, 1949) was an American art director. He was nominated for two Academy Awards in the category Best Art Direction.

Selected filmography
Smith was nominated for two Academy Awards for Best Art Direction:
 Captains of the Clouds (1942)
 San Antonio (1945)

References

External links

1886 births 
1949 deaths
American art directors
Artists from Pennsylvania